Wodzyński (feminine: Wodzyńska; plural: Wodzyńscy) is a Polish surname. Notable people with the surname include:

 Leszek Wodzyński (1946–1999), Polish hurdler
 Mirosław Wodzyński (born 1951), Polish hurdler, brother of Leszek

See also
 

Polish-language surnames